Tender Loving Care is a 1974 film directed by Don Edmonds and starring Donna Young. The plot concerns the adventures of three nurses. Though not part of the official "nurse" cycle of films from New World Pictures that began with The Student Nurses (1970), it was picked up for distribution by New World.

See also
 List of American films of 1974

References

External links

1970s exploitation films
American erotic drama films
1970s erotic drama films
1974 films
New World Pictures films
1974 drama films
1970s English-language films
1970s American films